Comacina (minor planet designation: 489 Comacina) is a minor planet located in the asteroid belt. It is named after Isola Comacina, an island in Lake Como, Italy.

References

External links
 

Background asteroids
Comacina
Comacina
C-type asteroids (Tholen)
19020902